May Dinam is a 1990 Indian Malayalam-language film, directed by A. P. Sathyan and produced by N. Gopalakrishnan. An adaptation of the novel of the same name by Mathew Mattam, the film stars Sai Kumar, Jagathy Sreekumar, Innocent, and Adoor Bhavani . The film had a musical score by M. G. Radhakrishnan. It also marked Lissy's last official Malayalam film on-screen- shortly after her marriage and subsequent retirement from the industry.

Cast

Jagathy Sreekumar as Damodharan
Innocent as Ouseph
Sai Kumar as Martin
Adoor Pankajam as Mariya
Balan K. Nair
Janardanan as Chachappan
Lalu Alex as SI Haridas
Mala Aravindan as Coach Warrier
Mamukkoya
Syama as Omana
Lissy as Elizabeth

Soundtrack
The music was composed by M. G. Radhakrishnan and the lyrics were written by K. Jayakumar.

References

External links
 

1990 films
1990s Malayalam-language films
Films based on Malayalam novels